Algimantas Liubinskas (born 4 November 1951 in Kybartai) is a former head coach of the Lithuania national football team.

Football
At 31 years old, Liubinskas became the youngest ever coach of the Soviet Supreme League team Žalgiris Vilnius (which he coached from April 1983 to April 1985).

In 1991, Algimantas Liubinskas was named the head coach of the Lithuanian national team, restored after Soviet occupation. Despite wins against Slovenia and Ukraine in 1994 FIFA World Cup qualifiers, Liubinskas was fired in 1995 after an argument with the Lithuanian Football Federation. His next job saw him move back into club football as he won the 1996/97 Lithuanian title with FK Kareda Šiauliai, but subsequent spells at FK Panerys Vilnius, Ekranas Panevėžys, and Polish side Jagiellonia Bialystok were less successful. He returned to coaching in 2002, as Lithuania's Under-21 coach, and was handed the senior team job the following year. In this position, he replaced Benjaminas Zelkevičius, who had been Liubinskas' replacement in 1995. Liubinskas lasted five years as head manager before he resigned in 2008. Famous results during his second tenure include a 1–1 draw against Germany in Nuremberg, a 1–0 victory over Scotland in Kaunas, and a 1–1 draw in Naples against Italy. All three fixtures occurred during European Championship qualifiers.

Prior to his coaching career, Liubinskas played 62 games for Žalgiris Vilnius from 1973 until 1974.

In December 2009 Liubinskas signed a deal to coach with FC Lviv in Ukrainian First League for the remainder of the 2009–10 season, but on 19 April 2010 he was sacked.

Honours
National Team
 Baltic Cup
 2005

Politics
On 4 August 2008, Liubinskas quit his role as national team coach in order concentrate on campaigning for a seat in the Seimas as a member of the Order and Justice party.

References

External links
 Liubinskas on UEFA.com

1951 births
Living people
Soviet footballers
Lithuanian footballers
FK Žalgiris players
Soviet football managers
Soviet expatriate football managers
Lithuanian football managers
Lithuanian expatriate football managers
Jagiellonia Białystok managers
Expatriate football managers in Bangladesh
Lithuania national football team managers
FK Žalgiris managers
FC Abahani Limited Dhaka managers
FK Kareda Kaunas managers
FK Panerys Vilnius managers
FC Kaisar Kyzylorda managers
Lithuanian expatriate sportspeople in Poland
Expatriate football managers in Poland
People from Kybartai
Association football defenders
Lithuanian expatriate sportspeople in Ukraine
Expatriate football managers in Ukraine